Cristian Valencia (born 4 December 1991) is a Colombian footballer who plays as a defender for Finnish club AC Oulu.

Club career
On 25 October 2021, he extended his contract with SJK. His contract with SJK was terminated on 31 May 2022. 

On 23 June 2022, Valencia signed a contract with AC Oulu, still in Finland, until the end of 2023, with an option for 2024.

References

1991 births
Living people
Association football defenders
Colombian footballers
Seinäjoen Jalkapallokerho players
AC Oulu players
Veikkausliiga players
Colombian expatriate footballers
Expatriate footballers in Finland
Colombian expatriate sportspeople in Finland
People from Villavicencio